The women's ski cross competition of the FIS Freestyle Ski and Snowboarding World Championships 2017 was held at Sierra Nevada, Spain on March 18 (qualifying and finals). 
21 athletes from 13 countries competed.

Results

Qualification
The following are the results of the qualification.

Elimination round
The following are the results of the elimination round.

Quarterfinals round

Heat 1

Heat 3

Heat 2

Heat 4

Semifinals round

Heat 1

Heat 2

Final round

Small final

Final

References

ski cross, women's